Darmwari is a village in the Augustmuni block of the Rudraprayag district of Uttarakhand, India. It had a population of 287 at the 2011 census.

References 

Villages in Rudraprayag district